Parvati is a Hindu/Sanskrit Indian feminine given name, which comes from the name of the goddess Parvati. Alternative spellings include Parvathy and Parvathi.

Notable people with the name 
 Parvathy Thiruvothu (born 1989), Indian actress, who has appeared in films including Maryan and Bangalore Days
 Parvati Prasad Baruva (1904–1964), Indian Assamese-language poet, lyricist and dramatist
 Parvathy Baul (born 1976), Indian Bengali-language singer, musician and storyteller
 Parvathy Jayadevan, Indian Malayalam-language playback singer
 Parvathy Jayaram (born 1970), Indian actress
 Parvati Khan (née Maharaj), Indian-Trinidadian singer
 Parvathi Krishnan (1919–2014), Indian politician
 Parvati Kumari, Indian classical Sufi music singer
 Parvati Melton, American-Indian actress, who has appeared in Telugu and Malayalam films
 Parvathy Nair (born 1991), Indian actress, who has appeared in films including Story Kathe and Yennai Arindhaal
 Parvathy Ratheesh, Indian Malayalam actress
 Parvathy Omanakuttan (born 1987) is an Indian Bollywood actress, model and the winner of the 2008 Miss India pageant
 Parvati Shallow (born 1982), American television personality
 Parvathy Soman (born 1997), Indian singer
 Parbati Barua, Indian conservationist, known for Queen of the Elephants BBC documentary
 Parbati Charan Das (1923–1949), first Kargil martyr of India, made supreme sacrifice when trying to cross river Indus in October 1949
 Parbati Chaudhary, member of 2nd Nepalese Constituent Assembly
 Parbati Giri (1926–1995), nicknamed the Mother Teresa of Western Odisha, was a prominent female freedom fighter from Odisha, India
 Parvathi Nayar (born 1964), Chennai born and based visual artist and creative writer
 Parvati Thapa (born 1970), Nepalese sports shooter

Fictional characters 
 Parvati Patil, from J.K. Rowling's Harry Potter series 
 Parvati "Paro" Chakraborty, from Sarat Chandra Chattopadhyay's 1917 novella, Devdas
 Parvati Wasatch, another name of Janice Soprano from the HBO TV series The Sopranos
 Parvati Holcomb, a possible companion character in the video game The Outer Worlds

See also 
 Parvatibai

Hindu given names
Indian feminine given names